The International School of Almaty (ISA) in Kazakhstan is a branch of the "Education Fund of Nursultan Nazarbayev". The school provides education on integrated programs of the state educational standard of the Republic of Kazakhstan and the International Baccalaureate of primary and basic schools from the 1st to the 11th grade.

In 2017 the school was admitted to the UNESCO Associated Schools. The International School of Almaty hosts an annual contest of social and creative projects of UNESCO Associated Schools.

Administration

The first director of the International School of Almaty is Akasheva Zhibek Zekenovna, an Honored Worker of Education of the Republic of Kazakhstan, laureate of Tarlan Prize.
The coordinator of international programs is Bazarbayeva Roza Kasymovna. Loginova Irina Viktorovna has been appointed as a new director of the International School of Almaty in 2020.

History
In 2000, the school became the first in Kazakhstan to be authorized by the International Baccalaureate Organization for the Middle Years Program.
In 2013, the school was authorized for the Primary Years Program, an elementary school program.
Since 2009, the school has been certified as a member of the Cambridge Educational Group.

See also

 List of international schools
 List of schools in Almaty

References

Further reading
 Kulibaeva Dinara. Managing International Schools in Kazakhstan: Theory and Practice, Almaty 2010. Print.

External links

International Baccalaureate Organization website

Schools in Kazakhstan
International schools in Kazakhstan
Education in Almaty